Mazoon bint Ahmad Ali Al-Mashani (also Romanized Maizoon or Mayzoon; 1925 – 12 August 1992) was the second wife of Sultan Said bin Taimur of Oman and the mother of Sultan Qaboos bin Said. Said's first wife, Fatima Al-Mashani, was her cousin.

Biography
Mazoon was born in 1925 in Eastern Dhofar, the southern province of Oman. She was the daughter of Sheikh Ahmad bin Ali Al-Mashani, a leader of the Al-Mashani tribe, a branch of the Al-Hakli tribe. She was a "Jebbali", thus a member of a mountain tribe.

In 1936, she became the second wife of Sultan Said bin Taimur. She was from the same tribe and a cousin of his first wife, Fatima. The wedding ceremony was not without complications. The wedding was interrupted because the Al-Mashani tribe was of the opinion that the bride price was not high enough. Therefore, they kidnapped the fiancée of the Sultan and carried her back into the mountains. Thereupon the Tabook tribe, another tribe belonging to Al-Hakli located around the mountains of Salalah, mounted a pursuit. They succeeded in stopping the kidnappers and forcing them to return to Salalah. The wedding was celebrated with the usual rejoicing and on 18 November 1940, Mazoon gave birth to the Sultan's only son Qaboos, the later Sultan and successor over her husband. Of her life little is known, except that Sultan Qaboos was cordially connected with his mother throughout his life.

She died in 1992 from her long lasting diabetes. Sultan Qaboos had her buried in her homeland region in Taqah. She was not only popular in her home province, but throughout Oman. On the occasion of her death a three-day-long state mourning was declared.

References

Omani royalty
1925 births
1992 deaths
People from Dhofar Governorate
Deaths from diabetes